Bo Johan Renck (born 5 December 1966) is a Swedish director of music videos, TV and film. He was originally a singer-songwriter from 1991 to 2001, using the moniker Stakka Bo, and had an international hit with his single "Here We Go" in 1993. Renck later became a music-video and television director, winning an Emmy Award in 2019 for his work on the mini-series Chernobyl.

Early life
Renck was born on 5 December 1966 in Uppsala, Sweden, the son of medical doctor and professor Hans Renck and nurse Marina Kylberg. Hans taught at several universities around the world, so the Renck family moved around and lived in Miami, Uppsala, Malmö, Tromsø and Kuwait. He graduated from Stockholm School of Economics with a degree in business.

Career

Music
While at university, he dated singer and ex-model Camilla Henemark of Army of Lovers, who introduced him to the Swedish music business. He started out as one half of Eurodance duo E-Type + Stakka B, but went solo after two singles, continuing to release music as Stakka Bo. 

Stakka Bo had a hit single in 1993 with the song "Here We Go", which peaked at No. 13 in the UK Singles Chart. Heavily influenced by the Stereo MCs, who were popular at the time, "Here We Go" appeared in an episode of the animated television series Beavis and Butt-Head and sitcom Derry Girls, in the films Prêt-à-porter, Never Been Kissed and Alien Autopsy and in the video game UEFA Euro 2004.

Due to a very tight budget, he ended up directing the first video for his solo project, and continued making his own videos, eventually directing videos of other Swedish artists such as Titiyo and The Cardigans.

Music videos
He has directed music videos for a number of artists including Madonna's "Nothing Really Matters" and "Hung Up", Kylie Minogue's "Love at First Sight", All Saints' "Black Coffee", Robyn's "Handle Me", Robbie Williams's "Tripping" and "She's Madonna", The Libertines' "What Became of the Likely Lads", Suede's "She's in Fashion", New Order's "Crystal" and "Krafty", Beyoncé's "Me, Myself and I", Chris Cornell's "Can't Change Me", The Knife's "Pass This On", Fever Ray's "Seven" and Bat for Lashes' "Daniel". In 2012 he directed the music video "Blue Velvet" for Lana Del Rey which was also used for the commercial campaign by H&M, as well as the music video for "Wild" by Beach House. In 2015 he directed the ten-minute video for David Bowie's "Blackstar", and "Lazarus" that appeared in January 2016. In 2005, he and his brother Martin directed two videos from Swedish band The Cardigans: "I Need Some Fine Wine and You, You Need to Be Nicer" and "Don't Blame Your Daughter (Diamonds)". He has been associated with Swedish artists like Karin Dreijer and Kent.

Film and television
Renck's first film, Downloading Nancy, 2008 premiered at the Sundance Film Festival on 21 January 2008 in Park City, Utah. While the movie didn't receive very strong reviews, it generated a call from Breaking Bad creator Vince Gilligan. He directed three episodes of AMC television drama Breaking Bad, and moved on to work on one episode of The Walking Dead, Halt and Catch Fire, and Bates Motel. 

In addition, Renck directed a fashion art film called Decadent Control for Imagine Fashion that premiered in March 2011. It starred Roberto Cavalli, Eva Herzigová, Kirsty Hume and Brad Kroenig and used fashion from Agent Provocateur and H&M.

He told Swedish magazine Cafe in 2017 that for a while he preferred to direct pilots (Vikings,  Bloodline), but now rather works on mini-series, where one can direct all episodes, such as with The Last Panthers. He says he turned down Better Call Saul, Game of Thrones and Homeland. He told the magazine: "And as the director of a TV-episode, you only have around 25 percent of input. There are two kinds of TV projects that I still agree to do, one is television series where each episode is a separate "entity", like Black Mirror, and the other is miniseries where you can do all the episodes, as I did with The Last Panthers. But of course I am very happy that Breaking Bad happened, it was very educational and exciting and fresh. Plus, it is hugely prestigious – people still call me because of it."

In 2019, Renck directed the mini-series Chernobyl, a dramatization of the 1986 Chernobyl disaster, for SKY and HBO, featuring among others Stellan Skarsgård, Jared Harris and Emily Watson. Renck won the Primetime Emmy Award for Outstanding Directing for a Limited Series, Movie, or Dramatic Special in 2019 for his work on Chernobyl. In January 2020, Renck won the Directors Guild of America Award for Movies for Television and Limited Series.

In the fall of 2019 it was announced that he was attached to the feature film Spaceman of Bohemia an adaptation to the book by U.S. based, Czech born writer Jaroslav Kalfař, with a screenplay written by Colby Day. The film is set up under Channing Tatum's company, Free Association.

In May 2020 Variety reported he was in negotiations to direct and executive produce the limited series "Girl A" for producer Elizabeth Gabler (former president of Fox 2000) and Sony Pictures Entertainment. The series is adapted from the novel by debut author Abigail Dean.

In June 2020, Renck was revealed as executive producer and director of the pilot episode of HBO's television adaptation of The Last of Us with Chernobyl collaborator Craig Mazin; in January 2021, he was forced to drop out of the project due to scheduling conflicts, replaced as the pilot's director by Kantemir Balagov.

Reneck was set to direct the pilot episode to Dune: The Sisterhood. But on 28 February 2023, it was announced that he left the project due to a creative overhaul.

Personal life
He is married to Elin Renck and has four children.

Discography

Studio albums

Singles

Filmography

Film

Television 
TV series

Miniseries

Awards and nominations

References

External links
Official website
Renck Åkerlund Films (R.A.F.)

1966 births
Living people
People from Uppsala
Swedish dance musicians
Swedish film directors
Swedish male singers
Swedish music video directors
Stockholm School of Economics alumni
English-language singers from Sweden